Eiffelton is a lightly populated locality in the Mid-Canterbury region of New Zealand's South Island.

Geography 

Eiffelton is situated on the Canterbury Plains near the Hinds River, which reaches the Pacific Ocean in nearby Longbeach.  The small township of Hinds is to Eiffelton's west.  Other nearby settlements include Lynnford between Eiffelton and Hinds, Willowby to the north, and Flemington and the ghost town of Waterton to the east.  The closest town of significant size is Ashburton to the north.

Ashburton balls 

Eiffelton's major claim to fame is that in 1978, it was the site of the discovery of an object similar to the Ashburton balls six years after the original balls were found.  The balls were pieces of space debris from the failed Russian space vessel Cosmos 482.

Religion 

Eiffelton once had a Catholic church.  Mass was first said in the area in 1888 in Waterton's town hall, but it was subsequently held in Eiffelton at either the school or the town hall.  On 4 June 1961, a proper church was built, the Church of St Thomas More, and 300 people gathered for its formal opening.  It seated 80 for regular services, but declining attendance meant that Mass was held only monthly in the early 1970s.  It closed on 7 November 1976, with the altar taken to a church in Hinds and the church's building moved to a nearby site to be used by local scouts.

Services 

Eiffelton has a town hall and formerly had a primary school.  As of 2000, it merged with two other nearby schools and relocated to a site in Willowby.  It also had a play centre for children under primary school age, but between 2001 and 2005, the play centre also relocated to Willowby.

Transport 

Eiffelton is not located on major transport routes.  It is not far from State Highway 1 and the Main South Line railway, which both pass through Hinds.

Demographics

Eiffelton had a population of 2,466 at the 2018 New Zealand census, an increase of 240 people (10.8%) since the 2013 census, and an increase of 678 people (37.9%) since the 2006 census. There were 870 households. There were 1,293 males and 1,170 females, giving a sex ratio of 1.11 males per female. The median age was 38.1 years (compared with 37.4 years nationally), with 546 people (22.1%) aged under 15 years, 429 (17.4%) aged 15 to 29, 1,179 (47.8%) aged 30 to 64, and 312 (12.7%) aged 65 or older.

Ethnicities were 88.2% European/Pākehā, 5.1% Māori, 0.7% Pacific peoples, 7.5% Asian, and 3.2% other ethnicities (totals add to more than 100% since people could identify with multiple ethnicities).

The proportion of people born overseas was 16.9%, compared with 27.1% nationally.

Although some people objected to giving their religion, 46.4% had no religion, 44.5% were Christian, 1.0% were Hindu, 0.5% were Buddhist and 0.7% had other religions.

Of those at least 15 years old, 333 (17.3%) people had a bachelor or higher degree, and 363 (18.9%) people had no formal qualifications. The median income was $43,700, compared with $31,800 nationally. The employment status of those at least 15 was that 1,140 (59.4%) people were employed full-time, 372 (19.4%) were part-time, and 30 (1.6%) were unemployed.

References 

Ashburton District
Populated places in Canterbury, New Zealand